The 2011 ASB Classic was a women's tennis tournament played on outdoor hard courts. It was the 26th edition of the ASB Classic, and was part of the WTA International tournaments of the 2011 WTA Tour. It took place at the ASB Tennis Centre in Auckland, New Zealand, from 3 to 8 January 2011. Gréta Arn won the singles title.

Singles entrants

Seeds

 Rankings as of 27 December 2010.

Other entrants
The following players received wildcards into the singles main draw:
  Kateryna Bondarenko
  Marina Erakovic
  Sacha Jones

The following players received entry from the qualifying draw:
  Noppawan Lertcheewakarn
  Sabine Lisicki
  Florencia Molinero
  Heather Watson

The following player received the lucky loser spot:
  Alberta Brianti

The following pairs received wildcards into the doubles main draw:
  Leela Beattie /  Emily Fanning

Champions

Singles

 Gréta Arn defeated  Yanina Wickmayer, 6–3, 6–3
 It was Arn's 1st title of the year and the 2nd of her career.

Doubles

 Květa Peschke /  Katarina Srebotnik defeated  Sofia Arvidsson /  Marina Erakovic, 6–3, 6–0

See also
 2011 Heineken Open – men's tournament

References

External links
Official website
WTA Tour official website
Singles and doubles main draws

ASB Classic
WTA Auckland Open
ASB
ASB
2011 in New Zealand tennis